Amir Shahab Razavian (born 25 May 1965 in Hamadan, Iran) is an Iranian film director, filmmaker and producer.

Razavian began his cinematic activities at Hamedan Amateur Film-making Centre in 1980 while still studying at high school (at Ebn-e Sinā  High School in Hamadan). He obtained his degree in film directing from College of Theatre and Cinema of Art University in 1990. From the same college he received in 1995 his post-graduate degree in animation. Since then he has produced seventy short films, directed thirty documentary and short films, and three feature films. The latter are The Journey of the Grey Men (Safar-e Mardān-e Khākestari), Tehran, Seven O'clock in the Morning (Tehrān Sā'at-e Haft-e Sobh) and Colors of Memory (with the original title Minā-ye Shahr-e Khāmoush, The Minā of the Extinguished Town).

Filmography
 The Journey of the Grey Men (Safar-e Mardān-e Khākestari - سفر مردان خاکستری)
 Tehran, Seven O'clock in the Morning (Tehrān Sā'at-e Haft-e Sobh - تهران ساعت هفت صبح)
 Colors of Memory (with the original title Minā-ye Shahr-e Khāmoush - مینای شهر خاموش, The Azure of the Extinguished Town)
 Granny & Summer (with the original title Tabestane Aziz - تابستان عزیز)

References

External links
 Rotterdam 
 Veriety
 Imdb 

Iranian film directors
Living people
Year of birth missing (living people)
Crystal Simorgh for Best Director winners